Gerald Baker (born 22 April 1939) is an English former professional footballer born in South Hiendley, then in Hemsworth Rural District, Yorkshire, who played as a full back in the Football League for Bradford Park Avenue.

References

1939 births
Living people
People from Hemsworth
English footballers
Association football fullbacks
Bradford (Park Avenue) A.F.C. players
King's Lynn F.C. players
English Football League players
Footballers from Yorkshire